Paul Depaepe (born 12 October 1931) is a Belgian former professional cyclist and world champion. He competed in the 4,000 metres team pursuit event at the 1952 Summer Olympics. He competed in motor-paced racing in the professionals category and won the European championships in 1961–1963 and the world championships in 1957; he finished in second place in the world championships in 1961–1963. He retired in 1965 after a serious back injury during training.

In 1946–1947, he was a successful cross country runner, but changed to cycling. As a road cyclist, he competed in 23 six-day races, with the best result of second place in the race of Antwerp in 1959.

He is married to Liane and had a son who died in 2001.

References

1931 births
Living people
Belgian male cyclists
Cyclists from Antwerp
Olympic cyclists of Belgium
Cyclists at the 1952 Summer Olympics
UCI Track Cycling World Champions (men)
Belgian track cyclists
Pacemakers